"Mouldy Old Dough" is an instrumental single, which was a hit for Lieutenant Pigeon.

It was written by Nigel Fletcher and Rob Woodward and first produced by them under the name of their other band, Stavely Makepeace.

Recorded in the front room of Woodward's Coventry semi-detached house, it featured his mother Hilda Woodward on piano, in a boogie-woogie, honky-tonk, ragtime style. The only lyrics are the growled title "Mouldy Old Dough" and "Dirty Old Man" by Fletcher.  When Fletcher asked what they meant, their author, Rob Woodward, said he had no idea.

It is the only British number one single to feature a mother and son.

Originally released in early 1972, it flopped on its first release. It was picked up in Belgium and used on a current affairs programme, and became a hit there, reaching number one in the Belgian singles chart. Decca, encouraged by this success, re-released it and with the backing of then BBC Radio 1 DJ Noel Edmonds, it finally became a hit in the UK, spending four weeks at the top of the UK Singles Chart in October 1972. It sold 790,000 copies.  In New Zealand, the song was number one for five weeks. The song also reached number one in Ireland and reached the Top 10 in Canada and Australia, but did not chart in the United States.

"Mouldy Old Dough" (the title being an adaptation of the 1920s jazz phrase, "vo-de-o-do") became the second biggest selling UK single of the year, behind The Band of the Royal Scots Dragoon Guards' bagpipe version of "Amazing Grace".

The tune was also used by LOTTO New Zealand as a successful advertising routine.

As of April 2019, Hilda Woodward's piano is an Exhibit at Coventry Music Museum, where other artefacts belonging to the band are also on display.

Chart history

Weekly charts

Year-end charts

Popular culture
 It was one of the choices of Jarvis Cocker when he appeared on the long-running BBC Radio 4 programme, Desert Island Discs.
 In a 1990 interview, Norman Cook revealed it was the first record he ever bought.
 Since 1972, the track has played over the PA system at the beginning of Oldham Athletic A.F.C. home games which coincided with the club rising from the fourth Division to the second Division.
 The song has been covered by British group Shades of Green and features in their first album Rockin' Poppin' Ravin', released in 1973 by Windmill Records, London (WMD 164 stereo).
 The song is widely regarded as the 'theme song' for the sport of Banger racing, where it is played at the start of races during the 'rolling lap'.
 It also became popular in New Zealand in the early 1990s due to its use in a television advertisement for Instant Kiwi scratchcards.

See also
 Winifred Atwell – had repeated number one hits with a similar boogie-woogie style of piano-playing.
 Russ Conway

References

1972 singles
UK Singles Chart number-one singles
Irish Singles Chart number-one singles
Number-one singles in New Zealand
London Records singles
Decca Records singles
1970s instrumentals